Alexander Leo Herman (May 10, 1899 – December 13, 1975) was an American Negro league outfielder in the 1920s and 1930s, and was the scout who discovered Baseball Hall of Famer Satchel Paige. He would later become the first African-American elected official in Alabama since the 19th century.

Biography 
A native of Mobile, Alabama, Herman attended Tuskegee University.

While playing and scouting for the Chattanooga Black Lookouts in 1925, Herman discovered Satchel Paige, a younger player who had a hometown connection to Herman from Mobile. Herman himself went on to play for the Memphis Red Sox in 1932.

He later became active in Democratic politics, eventually being elected to the Mobile County Democratic Committee. This made him the first African-American elected official in the state of Alabama since Reconstruction. He actively encouraged voter participation among other African Americans.

He was also active in the Knights of Peter Claver, the Benevolent and Protective Order of Elks, the YMCA, and helped invigorate Mardi Gras celebrations among Blacks in the area, founding the Mobile Area Mardis Gras Association, the oldest Black Carnival group in the city.

He died in Mobile in 1975 at age 76.

Personal life 
A devout Catholic, Herman was a parishioner of Most Pure Heart of Mary Catholic Church and was a member of its Holy Name Society.

He had one son, Kirk, and his daughter Alexis would become the United States Secretary of Labor under President Bill Clinton.

References

External links
 and Seamheads

1899 births
1975 deaths
Memphis Red Sox players
Baseball outfielders
Baseball players from Alabama
Sportspeople from Mobile, Alabama
20th-century African-American sportspeople
African-American Catholics